Glenn Taranto is an American actor and screenwriter. He played Gomez Addams in The New Addams Family.

He has appeared in six of Paul Haggis' projects.

Taranto's first screenplay, Stolen, starring Josh Lucas and Jon Hamm, was produced by A2 Entertainment and Code Entertainment and released to American theatres in 2010.

In 2020, Taranto played the role of Don Ennio Salieri in the 2020 video game, Mafia: Definitive Edition, a remake of the 2002 video game, Mafia, by Illusion Softworks.

Filmography

Film and television

Video games

References

External links
 

American male film actors
American male stage actors
American male television actors
American male voice actors
Living people
Year of birth missing (living people)
Place of birth missing (living people)